Alfredo Rene González (born July 13, 1992) is a Venezuelan professional baseball catcher for the Charleston Dirty Birds of the Atlantic League of Professional Baseball. He played in Major League Baseball (MLB) for the Chicago White Sox in 2018.

Career

Houston Astros
González signed with the Houston Astros as an international free agent in July 2008. He played the 2009 season with the DSL Astros. In 2011, he was assigned to the GCL Astros, where he would play that season and the 2012 season. In 2013, he played for the Greeneville Astros, and played for the Tri-City ValleyCats in 2014. In 2015, he spent time with the Quad Cities River Bandits, Lancaster JetHawks, and Corpus Christi Hooks. The Astros added him to their 40-man roster after the 2015 season. On June 25, 2016, the Astros designated González for assignment.

Chicago White Sox
On July 2, 2016, he was traded to the Chicago White Sox for cash and was assigned to the Birmingham Barons and also spent time with the Charlotte Knights before the season concluded. He spent the entire 2017 season with Birmingham. On September 17, 2017, he was outrighted off of the White Sox roster.

González had his contract selected on May 24, 2018, and was called up to the majors for the first time. He was outrighted off of the roster again on June 6, 2018. He would finish the 2018 season with Charlotte and Birmingham. He was invited to Spring Training for the 2019 season, but did not make the club and was assigned to Double-A Birmingham to start the 2019 season. After another season split between Charlotte and Birmingham, González elected free agency on November 4, 2019.

Charleston Dirty Birds
On June 14, 2022, González signed with the Charleston Dirty Birds of the Atlantic League of Professional Baseball. He played in 79 games for Charleston, hitting .281/.353/.509 with 17 home runs, 49 RBI, and 17 stolen bases.

On March 14, 2023, González re-signed with the Dirty Birds for the 2023 roster.

References

External links

1992 births
Living people
Major League Baseball players from Venezuela
Venezuelan expatriate baseball players in the United States
Major League Baseball catchers
Chicago White Sox players
Dominican Summer League Astros players
Venezuelan expatriate baseball players in the Dominican Republic
Gulf Coast Astros players
Greeneville Astros players
Tri-City ValleyCats players
Quad Cities River Bandits players
Lancaster JetHawks players
Corpus Christi Hooks players
Birmingham Barons players
Charlotte Knights players
Leones del Caracas players